Ján Plachetka (born February 18, 1945) is a chess Grandmaster from Slovakia.
 

He was awarded the GM title in 1978. He shared the 1st place at Polanica Zdrój 1975, was 1st at Sofia 1979, 1st at Trnava 1979, and shared the 1st place at Strasbourg 1985. He was also a member of the Czechoslovak Chess Olympiad teams from 1980 to 1986.

References

External links

1945 births
Living people
Slovak chess players
Chess grandmasters
Chess Olympiad competitors